The Wiscasset Jail and Museum is a historic jail on at 133 Federal Street (Maine State Route 218) in Wiscasset, Maine.  Built in 1811, it is one Maine's oldest surviving jail buildings, serving as the state's first penitentiary between 1820 and 1824.  It is now a museum operate by the Lincoln County Historical Society as the 1811 Lincoln County Museum and Old Jail.  It was listed on the National Register of Historic Places in 1970.

Description and history
The former Wiscasset Jail is located north of Wiscasset's village center, on the east side of Federal Street, overlooking the Sheepscot River.  The building has two distinct sections, one for the jail and the other for the keeper's residence.  The portion housing the cells is built out of granite and is three stories in height.  The interior consists of a central hall on each floor providing access to cells lining the long walls; the interior walls and floors are also granite.  Eleven of the twelve cells have heavily barred window openings; the twelfth, which was used for solitary confinement, has no window.  The third floor housed "apartments" used as debtor's cells and a work room.  The keeper's quarters, attached to one of the gabled short walls, are a two-story brick structure, with a five bay facade and central entrance typical of Federal period architecture.

Lincoln County was established in 1760, and had two different jails for the short-term retention of prisoners.  The present building was authorized by the county in 1807, and construnction lasted from 1809 to 1811.  The original keeper's house was destroyed by fire, and the present brick house was built in 1837.  It was until 1824 the only substantial place of incarceration in what was first the District of Maine of Massachusetts, and after 1820 the state of Maine.  It remained in active use until 1953, and was sold to the Lincoln County Historical Society the following year.  It has served as the society's headquarters and as a museum property since then.

See also
National Register of Historic Places listings in Lincoln County, Maine

References

External links
 Lincoln County Historical Association - official site
 Lincoln County Historical Association - Facebook page

Jails on the National Register of Historic Places in Maine
Government buildings completed in 1809
Defunct prisons in Maine
Museums in Lincoln County, Maine
Prison museums in the United States
History museums in Maine
Buildings and structures in Wiscasset, Maine
National Register of Historic Places in Lincoln County, Maine
Historic district contributing properties in Maine
Jails in Maine